Oscar Magaña (born July 3, 1987 in Pichidegua, Chile) is a Chilean footballer currently playing for Coquimbo Unido of the Primera División B in Chile.

Teams
  Magallanes 2006–2008
  Deportes Temuco 2009
  Trasandino de Los Andes 2010
  San Marcos de Arica 2011–2012
  Naval 2012-2013
  Barnechea 2013-2014
  Everton de Viña del Mar 2014-2015
  Coquimbo Unido 2015–present

References
 
 

1987 births
Living people
Chilean footballers
Magallanes footballers
Deportes Temuco footballers
Trasandino footballers
San Marcos de Arica footballers
Naval de Talcahuano footballers
A.C. Barnechea footballers
Everton de Viña del Mar footballers
Coquimbo Unido footballers
Primera B de Chile players
Association football defenders